The Jayanti Stadium in Bhilai is a multi-purpose stadium at Indra Place in Bhilai, India. The 20,000-capacity stadium is used mostly for football and field hockey and also for athletics.

Bhilai
Sports venues in Chhattisgarh

Buildings and structures in Bhilai
Year of establishment missing